Chang Yi is a Taiwanese professional baseball player. He is a pitcher for the Saitama Seibu Lions of Nippon Professional Baseball (NPB). Chang is of Taiwanese indigenous descent, with his father is ethnically Taroko and his mother is an ethnic Amis. 

Chiang played in the 2019 WBSC Premier12 for the Chinese Taipei national baseball team. He was selected to the national team roster for the 2023 World Baseball Classic, but withdrew from the competition following a diagnosis of shoulder bursitis.

References 

1994 births
Living people
Nippon Professional Baseball pitchers
Orix Buffaloes players
Taiwanese expatriate baseball players in Japan
People from Hualien County
Truku people
Amis people